Ana Grbac (born 23 March 1988) is a Croatian volleyball player. She is a member of the Croatia women's national volleyball team and plays for Hungarian club Szent Benedek.

She was part of the Croatian national team at the 2010 FIVB Volleyball Women's World Championship, and the 2014 FIVB Volleyball Women's World Championship in Italy.

References

External links 
 http://worldgrandprix.2016.fivb.com/en/group3/competition/teams/cro-croatia/players/ana-grbac?id=51164
 http://worldgrandprix.2017.fivb.com/en/group2/competition/teams/cro-croatia/players/ana-grbac?id=58220
 

1988 births
Living people
Croatian women's volleyball players
Croatian expatriate sportspeople in Switzerland
Place of birth missing (living people)
Volleyball players at the 2015 European Games
European Games competitors for Croatia
Setters (volleyball)
Expatriate volleyball players in Italy
Expatriate volleyball players in Switzerland
Expatriate volleyball players in Poland
Expatriate volleyball players in Azerbaijan
Expatriate volleyball players in Romania
Expatriate volleyball players in Greece
Expatriate volleyball players in Israel
Expatriate volleyball players in Slovenia
Expatriate volleyball players in Hungary
Croatian expatriate sportspeople in Italy
Croatian expatriate sportspeople in Poland
Croatian expatriate sportspeople in Azerbaijan
Croatian expatriate sportspeople in Romania
Croatian expatriate sportspeople in Hungary
Mediterranean Games medalists in volleyball
Mediterranean Games bronze medalists for Croatia
Competitors at the 2009 Mediterranean Games
21st-century Croatian women
Croatian expatriate volleyball players